Walter Irving Badger (January 15, 1859 – March 17, 1926) was an American football player and lawyer.

Badger was the quarterback on the undefeated 1879, 1880 and 1881 Yale Bulldogs football teams that have been recognized for winning three consecutive national championships. He was the quarterback in the same backfield with Walter Camp. He was also captain of the Yale baseball team.

Badger later became a Boston lawyer who was involved in many notable suits, including representation of Thomas Lawson, accused of stock manipulation, and Boston Gas Co. in 120 suits arising out of an 1897 gas explosion that killed nine persons.

References

1859 births
1926 deaths
19th-century players of American football
19th-century baseball players
American football quarterbacks
Yale Bulldogs baseball players
Yale Bulldogs football players
Players of American football from Boston
Baseball players from Boston